In enzymology, a glycerone kinase is an enzyme that catalyzes the chemical reaction

ATP + glycerone  ADP + glycerone phosphate

Thus, the two substrates of this enzyme are ATP and glycerone, whereas its two products are ADP and glycerone phosphate.

This enzyme belongs to the family of transferases, specifically those transferring phosphorus-containing groups (phosphotransferases) with an alcohol group as acceptor.  The systematic name of this enzyme class is ATP:glycerone phosphotransferase. Other names in common use include dihydroxyacetone kinase, acetol kinase, and acetol kinase (phosphorylating).  This enzyme participates in glycerolipid metabolism.

Structural studies

References

 

EC 2.7.1
Enzymes of known structure